The River Trail was a main route for travel in the colonial era of what is now the Canadian province of British Columbia, running northwards along the Fraser River from to present day Lillooet to Big Bar, British Columbia and points beyond in the Cariboo District.  The route was primarily in use during the Fraser Canyon Gold Rush and associated explorations by prospectors northwards in the search for gold in the Cariboo and Omineca Districts.

Less celebrated than its wagon-road contemporaries, the Old Cariboo Road and later on the Cariboo Road proper, the River Trail (also known as the "Mule Trail") was the choice for most prospectors and travellers heading north from Lillooet who could either not afford the tolls of the Old Cariboo Road, or had no need of it as the River Trail sufficed for foot-travel or horse travel with small packtrains. The wagon roads were built for freight wagons and stage travel, and also went up and over mountains and plateaus which travel via the River Trail did not require. Water was in short supply on this route, which is semi-desert for most of its length as far north as what is now Williams Lake, and the route was very rugged, but was favoured due to its lower elevation and more temperate climate than the official and more-documented routes eastward over the plateaus.

See also
Old Cariboo Road
Douglas Road
Fraser Canyon Gold Rush
Cariboo Gold Rush
Hudson's Bay Brigade Trail

References

British Columbia gold rushes
Pre-Confederation British Columbia
Lillooet Country
Cariboo
Historic trails and roads in British Columbia
Gold rush trails and roads